Lethenteron reissneri, the Far Eastern brook lamprey, is a species of non-parasitic lamprey. It is found in lakes and rivers in China, Japan, Korea, Mongolia, and the Russian Far East. It may be identical to the Siberian brook lamprey, Lethenteron kessleri.

References

reissneri